This is a list of the extreme points of San Marino: the points that are farther north, south, east or west than any other location.

Latitude and longitude 
 North : Falciano at 
 West : Gualdicciolo, near Acquaviva at 
 East : The intersection of the roads Strada del Marano and Strada del Fossa, in the castella of Faetano at

Altitude 
 Highest point : Monte Titano, 749 m at 
 Lowest point : Ausa River, 55 m

See also 
 Extreme points of Europe
 Extreme points of Earth
 Geography of San Marino

Geography of San Marino
Lists of coordinates
San Marino
Extreme